Victoria Sukhareva (born August 14, 1990) is a Russian female acrobatic gymnast. With partners Natalia Solodinina and Natalia Lavrukhina, Sukhareva competed in the 2014 Acrobatic Gymnastics World Championships.

References

1990 births
Living people
Russian acrobatic gymnasts
Female acrobatic gymnasts
21st-century Russian women